The 92 KQRS Morning Show (also known as the KQ Morning Crew) is a popular, long-running radio morning show originating from KQRS-FM in Minneapolis, Minnesota. It is one of the highest-rated local morning shows in America.

Controversy

Asian-Americans
On June 9, 1998, Barnard was reading a news item about a Hmong girl that had killed her newborn son.  The crew made several derisive remarks; in particular, Barnard stated that Hmongs should "assimilate or hit the goddamn road"   and, in response to his reading of the $10,000 fine levied against the girl, "That's a lot of egg rolls."  KQRS weathered protests from the Asian-American community and eventually issued a public apology in addition to making several PR-building concessions to the community.  In a related concession, Tony Lee's stereotypical character "Tak" and his segment, "A Talk with Tak" was removed from the show.

Native Americans
In September 2007, Terri and Tom made comments about the Minnesota Chippewa and Sioux tribes, respectively, and the American Indian Alliance that raised concerns from the tribes.  The tribes mounted several protests throughout October, and the station again issued a public apology.

Footnotes

References
Associated Press (via wire), KQRS morning show host addresses racial controversy, Minnesota Daily, October 21, 1998. Retrieved May 29, 2008.
Collins, Terry,  KQRS remarks upset Indian leaders, Star Tribune, October 29, 2007. Retrieved May 28, 2008.
Evans, Melanie, 'Free speech' wins in KQRS case, Minnesota Daily, November 15, 1998.  Retrieved May 27, 2008.
Lambert. Brian, Tommy B: King of All Radio, The Rake, October 29, 2007. Retrieved May 29, 2008.
––, Howard's End, St. Paul Pioneer Press, April 11, 1999. Retrieved May 29, 2008.
National Association of Broadcasters (NAB), 2006 Large Market Personality of the Year Winner: Tom Barnard, KQRS, 2006. Retrieved May 29, 2008.
Silverstein, Tom, Packer Notes: Favre ponders lawsuit, Milwaukee Journal-Sentinel, December 4, 1997.  Retrieved May 29, 2008.

Minneapolis–Saint Paul
American radio programs